2008–09 Pirveli Liga was the 20th season of the Georgian Pirveli Liga. The Pirveli Liga is the second division of Georgian Football. It consists of 4 reserve teams and professional teams.

Although reserve teams was allowed to play in the same league system, they were not be allowed to play in the same division and therefore cannot be promoted.

East Group Aghmoslaveti Group

Teams

Table

West Group Daslaveti Group

See also
2008–09 Umaglesi Liga
2008–09 Georgian Cup

External links
Georgia 2008/09 RSSSF
http://www.fcdinamo.ge/index.php?act=fulltable2&season=1&lang=en

Erovnuli Liga 2 seasons
2008–09 in Georgian football
Georgia